The Lahore School of Fashion Design, referred to as LSFD, is a private institute focused on Art and design education. It is located in Lahore.

Location

The campus is situated in 67/5 Usman Block, Opp Punjab University Hostel No 4 Garden town, Khayaban e Jamia Punjab, Lahore. 
Contact number (92) 42-35864868

Programs
 Art and Design
 Fashion Design
 Textile Design
 Interior Design
 Communication Design
 Visual Arts

Admission
For Degree the requirements are F.A/F.Sc/A-Level (Minimum 3 main subjects, no subsidiary) or equivalent (Minimum 50% marks). Students awaiting results are also eligible for provisional admission.
Equivalence certificates are required at the time of interview from candidates who apply on the basis of an examination other than F.A/ F.Sc. Applicants will have to appear in compulsory per-admission aptitude test followed by an interview.

Alumni
LSFD graduates are working as entrepreneurs, creative directors, designers, pattern makers and interior designers for brands internationally and in Pakistan.

References

Universities and colleges in Lahore
Fashion schools in Pakistan